Tourism in Malaysia is a major industry and contributor to the Malaysian economy.

Malaysia was once ranked 9th in the world for tourist arrivals.  The Travel and Tourism Competitiveness Report 2017 ranks Malaysia 25th out of 141 countries overall.

In an effort to diversify the economy and make Malaysia's economy less dependent on exports, the government pushed to increase tourism in Malaysia. As a result, tourism has become Malaysia's third largest source of foreign exchange income, and accounted for 7% of Malaysia's economy as of 2005.

The government agency in charge of promoting tourism in Malaysia is Tourism Malaysia or the Malaysia Tourism Promotion Board (MTPB). On 20 May 1987, the Ministry of Culture, Arts and Tourism (MOCAT) was established and TDC moved to this new ministry. TDC existed from 1972 to 1992, when it became the Malaysia Tourism Promotion Board (MTPB), through the Malaysia Tourism Promotion Board Act, 1992.

In 1999, Malaysia launched a worldwide marketing campaign called "Malaysia, Truly Asia" which was largely successful and brought in over 7.4 million tourists. The extra revenue generated by tourism helped the country's economy during the economic crisis of 2008.

Types of tourism

Medical tourism

Medical tourism is popular in Malaysia, with the Malaysia Healthcare Travel Council reporting an arrival of 641,000 foreign patients in 2011, 728,800 in 2012, 881,000 in 2013 and 882,000 in 2014. Malaysia Healthcare Travel Council, a government agency with the aim of promoting medical tourism, was launched in 2009 as an initiative by the Ministry of Health.

Tourist arrivals

Tourist arrivals
In 2016, Malaysia recorded 26,757,392 tourist arrivals, a growth of 4.0% compared to 25,721,251 in 2015. The table lists the top 15 arrivals to Malaysia by their origin countries.

Destinations and attractions

 Alor Star – capital of Kedah, the state of the paddy fields
 George Town – the capital city of Penang, one of the country's UNESCO World Heritage Sites since 7 July 2008.
 Ipoh – capital of Perak, famous for its Chinese food, tin mines and limestone mountains and caves
 Johor Bahru – capital of Johor, and gateway to Singapore
 Kangar – capital of Perlis, and gateway to Thailand
 Kota Kinabalu – capital of Sabah, nearest city to Mount Kinabalu
 Kota Bharu –  capital of Kelantan, and gateway to Thailand
 Kuala Terengganu – capital of Terengganu, famous for the turtles and beaches
 Kuantan – capital of Pahang, noted for its many beaches
 Kuching – capital of Sarawak, the Cat City of Malaysia
 Malacca City – a historical city in Malaysia. This is the other cultural World Heritage Site in Malaysia since 7 July 2008.
 Seremban – the capital of Negeri Sembilan, and the nearest cities to Port Dickson
 Putrajaya – the administrative centre of Malaysia
 Petaling Jaya – a satellite city located in the state of Selangor, and is in the proximity of Kuala Lumpur. It has the most commercial complexes in Malaysia.

Beside the main cities, there other town and places in Malaysia offer some special tourist attraction. Such as in Taiping for their landscape and local attraction. Teluk Intan for their Leaning tower. Genting Highlands, Cameron Highlands and Bukit Tinggi in Pahang for a cool climate. Muar in Johor is famous for its food. Miri is the official tourism-city and resort city of Sarawak and Sibu in Sarawak is famous for its landscape and parks.

Islands and beaches

Malaysia has several tropical islands. Some of the islands in Malaysia are:

 Kapas
 Labuan
 Langkawi
 Lang Tengah
 Mabul
 Pangkor
 Penang
 Perhentian
 Rawa
 Redang
 Sipadan
 Tenggol
 Tioman
 Tunku Abdul Rahman National Park

National parks and nature reserves

 Kubah National Park, Sarawak
 Bako National Park, Sarawak – famed for its wildlife, especially Bornean bearded pigs and proboscis monkeys
 Batang Ai National Park, Sarawak.
 Gunung Buda National Park, Sarawak.
 Gunung Mulu National Park, Sarawak
 Gunung Gading National Park, Sarawak
 Lambir Hills National Park, Sarawak
 Niah Caves National Park, Sarawak
 Loagan Bunut National Park, Sarawak
 Kinabalu National Park, Sabah – home of 4100 metre peak Mount Kinabalu
 Taman Negara National Park – the world's oldest rainforest, spanning Kelantan, Pahang and Terengganu
 Endau Rompin National Park, Johor
 Taman Eko Rimba, Kuala Lumpur - the nature reserve in the middle of Kuala Lumpur. The nature reserve is located near Kuala Lumpur Tower.

Other places of interest
 A' Famosa Resort, Malacca
 Aquaria KLCC, KL
 Bakelalan, Sarawak
 Bario, Sarawak
 Batu Caves, Selangor
 Batu Ferringhi, Penang
 Berjaya Hills Resort, Pahang
 Berjaya Times Square, KL
 Bukit Bintang, KL
 Cameron Highlands, Pahang 
 Central Market, KL
 Cheng Hoon Teng Temple, Malacca
 Chin Swee Caves Temple, Pahang
 Crystal Mosque, Terengganu
 Dhammikarama Burmese Temple, Penang
 Fort Cornwallis, Penang 
 Fraser's Hill, Pahang
 Genting Highlands, Pahang
 Gurney Drive, Penang
 Islamic Arts Museum, KL
 Kampung Baru, KL
 Kek Lok Si , Penang
 Kuala Gandah Elephant Sanctuary, Pahang
 Kuala Lumpur Bird Park, KL
 Kuala Lumpur Butterfly Park, KL
 Kuala Lumpur Tower, KL
 Long Pasia, Sipitang, Sabah
 Masjid Negara, KL
 Merdeka Square, KL
 Mines Wellness City, Selangor
 Muzium Negara, KL
 National Monument, KL
 Penang Hill, Penang
 Perdana Botanical Gardens, KL
 Petronas Twin Towers, KL
 Poh San Teng Temple, Malacca
 Snake Temple, Penang
 Sri Mahamariamman Temple, KL
 Stadium Merdeka, KL
 Sultan Abdul Samad Building, KL
 Sultan Salahuddin Abdul Aziz Mosque, Selangor 
 Sunway Lagoon, Selangor
 Thean Hou Temple, KL
 Wat Chetawan, Selangor
 Wat Phothivihan, Kelantan
 Zoo Negara, Selangor

See also
 List of museums in Malaysia
 Visa policy of Malaysia
 Tourist Police (Malaysia)
 Malaysian Tourist Guides Council

References

Top 15 arrivals by nationality

External links

 Tourism Malaysia
 Pahang Tourism official website